Yujiulü Dengzhu (r. 553)  was one of the last khagans of the remnant of Rouran.

Reign 
He fled to Northern Qi following demise of Yujiulü Anagui in 552 with his son Kangti and Anluochen. His second son Tiefa was raised to throne of Rouran in 552. However he soon died in a battle against Khitans in February 553. Hearing this, Dengzhu was sent back by Emperor Wenxuan of Northern Qi and returned to steppe with his elder son and took over leadership. However he too faced attacks from Tujue which was under rulership of Issik Qaghan. He was murdered by one of his advisors - Afuti (阿富提) and was replaced by Kangti.

References

Sources 

 History of the Northern Dynasties, vol. 86.

Khagans of the Rouran
553 deaths
6th-century murdered monarchs